Proteasome subunit alpha 8 also known as proteasome subunit alpha type-7-like is a protein that in humans is encoded by the PSMA8 gene. Proteasome subunit alpha 8 is a component of the  sperm specific proteasome.

References